New Jersey Blaze was an American soccer team based in Monmouth Junction, New Jersey, United States. Founded in 2009, the team played in the National Premier Soccer League (NPSL), a national amateur league at the fourth tier of the American Soccer Pyramid, in the Northeast Keystone Division between 2010 and 2011.

The team played its home games at Rowland Park. The team's colors are red and gold.

The Blaze organization is owned and operated by the New Jersey Soccer Group, a management company for a family of soccer-based companies offering soccer services in New Jersey.

History

Players

2010 Roster
Source:

Year-by-year

Head Coach(es)
  Rob Napier (2010–2011)

Stadia
 Rowland Park; Monmouth Junction, New Jersey (2010–2011)

External links
 NPSL Official Site
 New Jersey Soccer Group Official Site

Association football clubs established in 2009
National Premier Soccer League teams
Soccer clubs in the New York metropolitan area
2009 establishments in New Jersey
Soccer clubs in New Jersey